Bronson Rechsteiner (born October 24, 1997) is an American professional wrestler and former American football player. He is currently signed to WWE, where he performs on the NXT brand under the ring name Bron Breakker and is the current NXT Champion in his second reign. A second-generation professional wrestler, Rechsteiner is the son of Rick Steiner and the nephew of Scott Steiner (who performed together as the Steiner Brothers). He was voted "Rookie of the Year" for 2022 by readers of the Wrestling Observer Newsletter.

Early life; football career 
Rechsteiner was born in Woodstock, Georgia. He attended Etowah High School in Woodstock, where he played football, winning letters in three years. He also participated in wrestling, winning the Georgia Class AAAAAA state championship (220 lb weight class) in 2016. After graduating from high school, Rechsteiner went on to study at Georgia's Kennesaw State University, majoring in criminal justice. While attending Kennesaw, Rechsteiner played football for the Kennesaw State Owls. As a freshman in 2016 he played special teams and defense. In 2017, he moved to offense as a running back. In February 2020, Rechsteiner entered the NFL Scouting Combine but was not drafted. In April 2020, he was signed by the Baltimore Ravens as an undrafted free agent fullback. He was released in August 2020.

Professional wrestling career 
Rechsteiner debuted in professional wrestling on October 8, 2020 in Ringgold, Georgia at the "WrestleJam 8" event promoted by AWF/WOW, defeating Jamie Hall.

In February 2021, WWE announced Rechsteiner had signed a developmental contract with the company. Later that month, he was assigned to the WWE Performance Center in Orlando, Florida for training. At the WrestleMania Backlash pay-per-view on May 16, Rechsteiner and several other wrestlers portrayed "zombies" in a lumberjack match between Damian Priest and The Miz. In August 2021, he appeared on an episode of NXT, portraying a security guard who was attacked by Samoa Joe. Rechsteiner wrestled his first match for WWE on the September 14, 2021 episode of NXT under the ring name "Bron Breakker", defeating LA Knight; he later had a staredown with new NXT Champion Tommaso Ciampa. Breakker unsuccessfully challenged Ciampa for the title at the Halloween Havoc television special on October 26. In November 2021, Breakker participated in WWE's tour of the United Kingdom. At WarGames on December 5, Breakker teamed with Carmelo Hayes, Grayson Waller, and Tony D'Angelo (as "Team 2.0") to defeat Ciampa, Knight, Johnny Gargano, and Pete Dunne ("Team Black & Gold") in a WarGames match, with Breakker pinning Ciampa.

At New Year's Evil on January 4, 2022, Breakker defeated Ciampa by submission to win the NXT Championship, the first title of his wrestling career. At Vengeance Day on February 15, he made his first successful title defense, defeating Santos Escobar. Breakker made his main roster debut on the March 7 episode of Raw, teaming with Ciampa to defeat Dolph Ziggler and Robert Roode in a tag team match. At Roadblock the following day, Breakker defended the NXT Championship against Ciampa and Ziggler in a triple threat match, with Ziggler pinning Ciampa to end Breakker's reign at 63 days. On April 1, Breakker inducted his father and uncle into the WWE Hall of Fame; the following night at Stand & Deliver, he challenged Ziggler for the title in a losing effort. On the April 4 episode of Raw, Breakker defeated Ziggler to win the NXT Championship for a second time. On the following episode of NXT, he retained the title against Gunther. Breakker subsequently began feuding with Joe Gacy after Gacy kidnapped Rick Steiner, leading to a match between the two at Spring Breakin'  on May 3, where Breakker defeated Gacy to retain the title. At In Your House on June 4, he defeated Gacy in a rematch, with the added stipulation that he would lose the title if he got disqualified. At the Great American Bash on July 5, Breakker retained the title against Cameron Grimes, and was attacked by the debuting J. D. McDonagh after the match. At Heatwave on August 16, Breakker retained the title against McDonagh; after the match, he was confronted by NXT United Kingdom Champion Tyler Bate. At Worlds Collide in September 2022, Breakker defeated Bate to unify the NXT Championship and NXT United Kingdom Championship. At Halloween Havoc in October 2022, Breakker defeated McDonagh and Ilja Dragunov in a triple threat match to retain the NXT Championship. At NXT Deadline in December 2022, Breakker successfully defended the NXT Championship against Apollo Crews.

At New Year's Evil on January 10, 2023, Breakker defeated Grayson Waller via countout to retain the NXT Championship; at Vengeance Day on February 4, he defeated Waller once again, this time in a cage match.

Professional wrestling style and persona 
Breakker wrestles in a "powerhouse" style. His finishing moves are a camel clutch dubbed the Steiner Recliner (a move adopted from his uncle Scott Steiner), a gorilla press powerslam, and a spear.

Championships and accomplishments
Pro Wrestling Illustrated
Ranked No. 26 of the top 500 singles wrestlers in the PWI 500 in 2022
WWE
 NXT Championship (2 times, current)
 Wrestling Observer Newsletter
 Rookie of the Year (2022)

References

External links 
 
 
 
 
 Kennesaw State Owls bio

1997 births
21st-century professional wrestlers
American football running backs
American male professional wrestlers
Baltimore Ravens players
Kennesaw State Owls football players
Kennesaw State University alumni
Living people
NXT Champions
People from Woodstock, Georgia
Professional wrestlers from Georgia (U.S. state)